Jackson Township is one of twenty townships in Allen County, Indiana, United States. As of the 2010 census, its population was 504.

Geography

Unincorporated towns
 Edgerton at 
 Townley at 
(This list is based on USGS data and may include former settlements.)

Adjacent townships
 Maumee Township (north)
 Harrison Township, Paulding County, Ohio (northeast)
 Benton Township, Paulding County, Ohio (east)
 Monroe Township (south)
 Madison Township (southwest)
 Jefferson Township (west)
 Milan Township (northwest)

Four Presidents Corners, a monument, was built in 1917 where Jackson Township meets with Monroe, Madison, and Jefferson townships. All four townships are named after presidents.

Major highways

School districts
 East Allen County Schools

Political districts
 Indiana's 6th congressional district
 State House District 79
 State Senate District 14

References

Citations

Sources
 United States Census Bureau 2008 TIGER/Line Shapefiles
 United States Board on Geographic Names (GNIS)
 IndianaMap

Townships in Allen County, Indiana
Fort Wayne, IN Metropolitan Statistical Area
Townships in Indiana